The Korean martial art Taekwondo has several stances used for different activities. Taekwondo has a wide varietyits repertoire. These stances are most commonly seen in the form competition of Hyeong, and are critical for balance, precision, and good technique in the martial art.

Basic stances
There are two major organizations of Taekwondo: the World Taekwondo Federation and the International Taekwondo Federation. These two schools, while similar, show variance in their teachings of some of the stances. Individual schools within these larger umbrellas will also vary slightly in their teachings, but not to the large extent seen between WTF, ITF and LTF taekwondo.

Different stances

Fighting stance
This stance varies with the martial art and practitioner, but is the basic all-purpose stance used in sparring and combat. Common features across the arts include turning the body to the side to present a smaller target, slightly bent knees for balance and agility, feet about two shoulder widths apart, and hands up, protecting the head. In an art relying heavily on kicks, the body's mass is usually shifted slightly to the back leg, making the front leg easier to lift and increasing the speed of kicks. Regardless of the exact stance, this is the most familiar stance for a martial artist. All other stances, blocks, and attacks flow from this stance. Interestingly enough this often results in an increased power level.

Diagonal stance
Sasun Seogi. Found in ITF taekwondo. This stance is very similar to the sitting stance, however one foot will be slightly more forward than the other.

Crouched stance
Oguryo Seogi. Found in ITF taekwondo. In this stance, the feet are spread wide apart, one foot slightly in front of the other. The knees are bent inward.

See also
Karate stances

References

Taekwondo